Ashaye (born Trevor Julian Ashaye) is a British singer. His single "Michael Jackson Melody" entered the UK Singles Chart on the 15 October 1983. It was in the chart for three weeks, reaching a peak position of number 45.  The single was a medley of several Michael Jackson cover versions; "Don't Stop 'til You Get Enough", "Wanna Be Startin' Somethin'", "Shake Your Body (Down to the Ground)", and "Blame It on the Boogie".

Ashaye started his music career under the managerial guidance of Steve Walsh in a group called Earthline Connection. Ashaye signed up with R&B Records to release a Michael Jackson medley, which reached the national chart. After his slight brush with fame, Ashaye teamed up with musicians/songwriters Robert Chandler, Nick Austin and Alex Palmer.

References

Year of birth missing (living people)
Living people
British pop singers
British male singers